Hamai English High School is located in the Eastern region of India, in the state of Manipur, Tamenglong District, Namraining Tamei Hq, and belongs to a minority tribe called, 'Liangmai Naga' 

High schools and secondary schools in Manipur